The Grange Estate, also known as Maen-Coch and Clifton Hall, is a historic mansion built by Henry Lewis Jr. (1671–1730) in Havertown, Pennsylvania, near Philadelphia, in Delaware County, Pennsylvania. Parts of a c. 1700 residence may be incorporated in the carriage house. The main house, built in c. 1750 and expanded several times through the 1850s, was purchased by Haverford Township in 1974. The building was added to the National Register of Historic Places in 1976 as The Grange.

The mansion, an example of the Gothic Revival style, is presented in the state it was in at the turn of the 20th century. The grounds also feature Victorian gardens.

The house was owned by patriot and Philadelphia merchant John Ross during the late 18th century, who named his country estate after the home of Lafayette. Ross's house was frequented by several notable historic figures, including George Washington and Lafayette.

In 1815, the house was purchased by Manuel Eyre, Jr., son of Washington aide Manuel Eyre, who served with Washington during the Revolution. The Eyre family held the estate longer than any other, first from 1815 to 1846, and then, through their Ashhurst cousins, from 1848 to 1911.

The last family to occupy the mansion did so from 1913 until 1974, when it was sold to the Haverford Historical Society.

The mansion is now maintained as a museum and community center. Regular tours are available from April to October and during the December holidays.

References

Further reading
H.D. Eberlein and H.M. Lippincott, The Colonial Homes of Philadelphia and Its Neighbourhood, J.B. Lippincott Co., Phila. and London, 1912.

External links
The Grange Estate
Photograph (1897) at Bryn Mawr College
Maen-Coch, 200 Grove Place (Haverford Township), Havertown, Delaware County, PA: 8 photos, 4 data pages, and 1 photo caption page at Historic American Buildings Survey

Houses on the National Register of Historic Places in Pennsylvania
Haverford Township, Pennsylvania
Museums in Delaware County, Pennsylvania
Historic house museums in Pennsylvania
Gothic Revival architecture in Pennsylvania
Houses completed in 1685
Houses in Delaware County, Pennsylvania
National Register of Historic Places in Delaware County, Pennsylvania
1685 establishments in Pennsylvania